is a 1991 golf simulation game for the Nintendo Entertainment System. It features all the small details of real golf, such as wind, angle at which the ball is hit, etc. The game uses a password feature and up to four people can play.

Gameplay
There are three options to play: tournament mode allows the player to play a normal tournament and there are two modes to train in.
one of the most detailed golf games for the NES.

Notes

External links

1991 video games
Atlus games
Hect games
Golf video games
Nintendo Entertainment System games
Nintendo Entertainment System-only games
Tose (company) games
Multiplayer and single-player video games
Video games developed in Japan